This is a list of lighthouses in the United States. The United States has had approximately a thousand lights as well as light towers, range lights, and pier head lights. Michigan has the most lights of any state with over 150 past and present lights. Lighthouses that are in former U.S. territories are not listed here.

Most of the lights in the United States have been built and maintained by the Coast Guard (since 1939) and its predecessors, the United States Lighthouse Service (1910–1939) and the United States Lighthouse Board (1852–1910). Before the Lighthouse Board was established, local collectors of customs were responsible for lighthouses under Stephen Pleasonton. As their importance to navigation has declined and as public interest in them has increased, the Coast Guard has been handing over ownership and in some cases responsibility for running them to other parties, the chief of them being the National Park Service under the National Historic Lighthouse Preservation Act of 2000. 

Note: Click on the state of your choice in the tables below to link you to lighthouses in that state.

New England

New Hampshire
The state of New Hampshire only has two lighthouses, both of which are located along the Atlantic coastline.

Vermont

Note: All entries here show the current tower's status; more details can be found in the lighthouse articles.

Mid-Atlantic

Midwest

Nebraska
The state of Nebraska has at least two faux lighthouses which were first lit in 1939. There is no evidence that either were used for navigational purposes as the state has no large bodies of water that would require the need. Linoma Lighthouse is located on a privately owned recreation area which was developed around an artificial lake, while Lake Minatare Lighthouse was "built to simulate a lighthouse". Also of note is a faux lighthouse called Rock Garden Lighthouse (not listed below), located in Kearney.

Pacific (states)

South

United States territories

United States Minor Outlying Islands

This table lists lighthouses that are in insular areas of the United States. All of the islands listed below are uninhabited, and have not been formerly incorporated into the country.

See also

 List of lighthouses in the United States by height
 National Historic Preservation Act of 1966
 National Historic Lighthouse Preservation Act
 United States Lighthouse Society
 List of lightships of the United States
 Lists of lighthouses

Further reading
 Crompton, Samuel Willard  & Michael J. Rhein, The Ultimate Book of Lighthouses (2002) ; .
 Hyde, Charles K., and Ann and John Mahan. The Northern Lights: Lighthouses of the Upper Great Lakes. Detroit: Wayne State University Press, 1995.  .
 Jones, Ray & Bruce Roberts, American Lighthouses (Globe Pequot, September 1, 1998, 1st Ed.) ; .
 Jones, Ray,The Lighthouse Encyclopedia, The Definitive Reference (Globe Pequot, January 1, 2004, 1st ed.) ; .
 Noble, Dennis, Lighthouses & Keepers: U. S. Lighthouse Service and Its Legacy Annapolis: U. S. Naval Institute Press, 1997. ; .
 Oleszewski, Wes, Great Lakes Lighthouses, American and Canadian: A Comprehensive Directory/Guide to Great Lakes Lighthouses, (Gwinn, Michigan: Avery Color Studios, Inc., 1998) .
 Penrod, John, Lighthouses of Michigan, (Berrien Center, Michigan: Penrod/Hiawatha, 1998)  .
 Penrose, Laurie and Bill, A Traveler's Guide to 116 Michigan Lighthouses (Petoskey, Michigan: Friede Publications, 1999).  
 
 Putnam, George R., Lighthouses and Lightships of the United States, (Boston: Houghton Mifflin Co., 1933).
 Roach, Jerry, Ultimate Guide to Great Lakes Lighthouses, (2003).
 Thurston, Harry,Against Darkness and Storm: Lighthouses of the Northeast (Halifax: Nimbus, 1993).
 United States Coast Guard, Aids to Navigation, (Washington, DC: U. S. Government Printing Office, 1945).
 
 U.S. Coast Guard, Historically Famous Lighthouses (Washington, D.C.: Government Printing Office, 1957).
 
 Wagner, John L., Michigan Lighthouses: An Aerial Photographic Perspective, (East Lansing, Michigan: John L. Wagner, 1998)  .
 Weiss, George, The Lighthouse Service, Its History, Activities and Organization (Baltimore: Johns Hopkins Press, 1926).
 Wright, Larry and Wright, Patricia, Great Lakes Lighthouses Encyclopedia Hardback (Erin: Boston Mills Press, 2006) .

Notes
Sources remain split on this issue, with at least one claiming the latter as the shortest in New England.
B. The Perry Monument in Ohio and the Statue of Liberty in New York City are not classified as lighthouses. They would come in as the two tallest lighthouses in the United States otherwise.
C. Minnesota Point Light was built in 1858, but only half of the now ruined tower remains.
D. The oldest light station is Pottawatomie Light which was established in 1836; however, the current buildings date to 1858.
E. The shortest height is for a skeletal tower which was placed in 1981. For "traditional" lighthouses, Point Retreat Light and Cape Spencer Light are tied at  each.
F. These two lighthouses are tied at  each.
G. The oldest lighthouse in Hawaii was called "Lahaina Lighthouse", which was built in 1905 before it was replaced. Moloka'i Light is the oldest currently standing lighthouse; it was first lit a month before the still standing Makapuu Point Light.
H. Pass A L'Outre Light was originally constructed in 1852 elsewhere and moved to its present location.
I. Cat Island Light (first tower), Pass Christian Light, and Ship Island Light were all 30 feet tall.

References

External links

General
Lighthouses in the National Park System

Lighthouse Friends
 a comprehensive international listing maintained by Russ Rowlett
Inventory of Historic Light Stations from the National Park Service
Interactive map of lighthouses all over the country
Lighthouses in the National Park System
Amateur Radio Lighthouse Society (ARLHS) U.S. LIGHTHOUSES BY STATE
Lighthouses: An Administrative History
Historical Landmarks - United States Lighthouses

Great Lakes
Wisconsin Historical Society, antique photographs of Wisconsin lighthouses
Terry Pepper on lighthouses of the Western Great Lakes
 Bibliography on Michigan and other lighthouses
A more comprehensive (and interactive with geographic locations) listing of Michigan lighthouses and museums, complete with pictures and descriptions
Detroit News, interactive map on Michigan lighthouses
Map of Michigan Lighthouse in PDF format
Wagner, John L. Beacons Shining in the Night, Michigan Lighthouse Bibliography, Chronology, History, Keepers Lives, and Photographs, Clarke Historical Library, Central, Michigan University

 
United States Coast Guard